Mohamad Ashari bin Samsudin (born 7 June 1985) is a retired Malaysian footballer who mainly plays as a right winger but can also play as a forward and an attacking midfielder. Ashari has a great dribbling skill with a good vision and pace in the game making him one of the fan's favourite in the team.

Club career

Terengganu
Originally from Bukit Payong, Marang, Terengganu, Ashari started his career with Terengganu youth team. He was promoted to Terengganu's senior team during the 2007-08 Super League Malaysia. He showed impressive playing style as he netted 9 goals in his debut season.

He is consistently scoring for Terengganu. He was second top scorer in the 2009 season with 17 goals, one goal behind the winner Mohd Nizaruddin Yusof. He goes one better in the 2010 Super League Malaysia season, winning the Golden Boot while scoring 18 goals. In the 2011 league season, he scored 10 goals.

Among his achievements with Terengganu is winning the 2011 Malaysia FA Cup and defeating Kelantan FA in the final on 11 June 2011. He also was the top scorer in the Sukma Games 2008 football tournament held at Terengganu, where he helped the Terengganu youth team win the gold medal. In the 2012 Malaysia League Cup Final, he scored the opening goal for his team in a 2-1 loss to Negeri Sembilan.

Pahang
On 7 November 2016, it was announced that Ashari signed a one-year contract with Pahang.

International career
His performance in the national league in 2008 attracted the national coach at that time, B. Sathianathan, to take him into Malaysia national squad.

Ashari made his international senior debut for Malaysia against India on 22 July 2008. Ashari scored his first international goals in Malaysia 6–0 trashing of Afghanistan in the 2008 Merdeka Tournament, where Ashari scored twice.

In November 2010, Ashari was called up to the Malaysia national squad by coach K. Rajagopal for the 2010 AFF Suzuki Cup. Ashari scored 1 goal from outside penalty box for Malaysia against Indonesia in the first leg of the final to secure a 3–0 win, and helping Malaysia en route to win 4-2 on the aggregate the AFF Suzuki Cup for the first time in their history.

Career statistics

Club

International

International goals

Honours

Club
Terengganu
 Malaysia FA Cup: 2011

International

Malaysia
 AFF Championship: 2010

Individual
 2010 Malaysia Super League Golden Boot (18 goals)

References

External links

1985 births
Living people
Malaysian footballers
Malaysia international footballers
Terengganu FC players
Sri Pahang FC players
People from Terengganu
Malaysia Super League players
Association football forwards
Association football wingers
Malaysian people of Malay descent